Kazooloo is an augmented reality video game powered by a mobile app and a physical game board. The game was developed by American indie studio Unlimited Reality and released in iOS and Android platforms in 2014. A sequel of the game called Kazooloo DMX was never launched, although it was going to be launched in 2016.

Unlike  most  mobile  games  in  the  market  that  encourage players to sit  down  and  be static the Kazooloo game requires the player to move constantly around the board to avoid enemies’ shots. Kazooloo is being presented at Hamleys and Harrods

Gameplay

Kazooloo is a first-person shooter in AR. The player's objective is to shoot enemies coming from the Kazooloo dimensions into their real life surroundings, and dodge enemy attack by physically moving around the game board. Every level of the game has different creatures to fight. As the player progresses, enemies become more difficult to defeat and require more movement of the player.

References

Mobile games
2014 video games
Augmented reality games
IOS games
Android (operating system) games
Video games developed in the United States